Arthur Andreas Arntzen (born 10 May 1937) is a Norwegian journalist, humorist, actor and writer.

He was discovered by Håkon Karlsen and is particularly known for his character "Oluf Rallkattli". In 1994 he was appointed professor II in humour at the University of Tromsø. He was awarded the Leonard Statuette for 1999 and was decorated Knight, First Order of the Royal Norwegian Order of St. Olav in 2000.

Selected works
Han Oluf (1967)
Ho Emma (1968)
Æ lyg ikkje (1986)

References

1937 births
Living people
People from Tromsø
Norwegian journalists
Norwegian male writers
Norwegian male actors
Norwegian humorists
Academic staff of the University of Tromsø
Leonard Statuette winners